OSW may refer to:

 FAL OSW, a variant of the FN FAL folding-stock paratrooper rifle
 Centre for Eastern Studies, a Polish think tank
 Official Scrabble Words, a Scrabble lexicon
 The original name of the Barrett XM109